Benny Greb (born 13 June 1980 in Augsburg, West Germany) is a German drummer, singer and clinician. He started playing the drums at age six and began taking lessons at age twelve. He has also performed at the Modern Drummer Festival 2010 and at many clinics and drum festivals around the world. Greb is endorsed by Sonor Drums and has his signature snare, Remo Drum Heads, Vic Firth, and by Meinl Percussion. He developed with Meinl a signature line of Byzance Vintage Series cymbals including the "Sand Ride" and "Sand Hats," both known for their sandblasted finishes. In 2012, Meinl introduced new "Sand Crash" and "Sand Crash/Ride" cymbals to the Byzance Vintage lineup. Furthermore, Benny has a set of trash hats that he uses on the right side of his kit.

In 2009, Greb released his Hudson Music DVD "The Language of Drumming". In 2015, he released his DVD "The Art And Science Of Groove".

Gear
Greb endorses Sonor Drums

 Sonor Vintage Series in "Vintage Pearl"
 20" x 14" Bass Drum
 10" x 8" Tom
 16" x 14" Floor Tom
 13" x 5.75" Signature Snare 2.0 (Beech)
 13" x 5.75" Signature Snare 2.0 (Brass)

Greb endorses Meinl Percussion and Meinl Cymbals.

(From Left to Right)

 8" Classics Bell High (used as Xhat bottom) 
 8" Byzance Dark Splash (used as Xhat top)
 14” GenerationX Trash Hat China (second hihat bottom) (occasionally)
 14” Byzance Sand hats
 14” Generation X Trash Hat China (used underneath the crash)
 18” Byzance Sand Thin Crash (on top of the China)
 8" Artist Concept Crasher Hats
 20” Byzance Sand Ride
 16” Byzance Trash Crash (two pcs used as Xhat)
 22” Byzance Sand Crash Ride
 Hardware – Sonor 600 Series
 Pedals – Sonor Giant Step
 Drum Heads – Remo
 Sticks – Vic Firth Benny Greb Signature Sticks
 Percussion Meinl Bongos, Cowbells and Shakers

Discography

Poetry Club
2007: Goldene Zeit

Stoppok
2008: Sensationsstrom
2009: Auf Zeche

Jerobeam
2004: Confidential Breakfast
2009: How One Becomes What One Is

Benny Greb
2005: Grebfruit
2009: Brass Band
2013: Two Day Trio
2014: Moving Parts
2016: Moving Parts (Live)
2017: Grebfruit 2

3erGezimmeR
2009: 3erGezimmeR

Strom und Wasser
2005: Spielt Keine Rolle
2006: Gossenhauer
2007: Farbengeil
2009: Emotionsdesign
2011: Mondpunk

Thomas D
2011: Lektionen in Demut 11.0

Blue Touch Paper
2011: Stand Well Back
2013: "Drawing Breath"

Ron Spielman Trio
2008: Absolutely Live
2012: Electric Tales

Nils Wülker
2012: Just Here Just Now
2015: Up
2017: ON

DVDs
2009: The Language of Drumming
2010: Modern Drummer Festival
2015: The Art & Science Of Groove

Nick Johnston
2019: Wide Eyes in The Dark

Notes

External links

Drummerworld Profile
Benny Greb in Ukraine

Living people
1980 births
German drummers
Male drummers
21st-century drummers
21st-century German male musicians